The Thai League Cup is a knock-out football tournament played in Thai sport. Some games are played as a single match, others are played as two-legged contests. The 2015 Thai League Cup kicked off on   31 January 2015 . The Thai League Cup has been readmitted back into Thai football after a 10-year absence. The Thai League Cup is sponsored by Toyota thus naming it Toyota League Cup. The prize money for this prestigious award is said to be around 5 million baht and the runners-up would net 1 million baht.

The prize money is not the only benefit of this cup, the team winning the fair play spot will get a Hilux Vigo. The MVP of the competition will get a Toyota Camry Hybrid Car. The winner of the cup will earn the right to participate on a cup competition in Japan.

This was the first edition of the competition and the qualifying round was played in regions featuring clubs from the Regional League Division 2.

Calendar

1st Qualification Round

Northern Region
The qualifying round was played in regions featuring clubs from the 2015 Thai Division 2 League Northern Region

North Eastern Region
The qualifying round was played in regions featuring clubs from the 2015 Thai Division 2 League North Eastern Region

Central & Eastern Region
The qualifying round was played in regions featuring clubs from the 2015 Thai Division 2 League Central & Eastern Region

Central & Western Region
The qualifying round was played in regions featuring clubs from the 2015 Thai Division 2 League Central & Western Region

Bangkok & field Region
The qualifying round was played in regions featuring clubs from the 2015 Thai Division 2 League Bangkok & field Region

Southern Region
The qualifying round was played in regions featuring clubs from the 2015 Thai Division 2 League Southern Region

2nd Qualification Round

Northern Region
The qualifying round was played in regions featuring clubs from the 2015 Thai Division 2 League Northern Region

North Eastern Region
The qualifying round was played in regions featuring clubs from the 2015 Thai Division 2 League North Eastern Region

Central & Eastern Region
The qualifying round was played in regions featuring clubs from the 2015 Thai Division 2 League Central & Eastern Region

Central & Western Region
The qualifying round was played in regions featuring clubs from the 2015 Thai Division 2 League Central & Western Region

Bangkok & field Region
The qualifying round was played in regions featuring clubs from the 2015 Thai Division 2 League Bangkok & field Region

Southern Region
The qualifying round was played in regions featuring clubs from the 2015 Thai Division 2 League Southern Region

Qualification-Playoff Round

First round

Second round

Third round

Quarter-finals

|-
|}

1st leg

2nd leg

Semi-finals

|-
|}

1st leg

2nd leg

Final

See also
 2015 Thai Premier League
 2015 Thai Division 1 League
 2015 Regional League Division 2
 2015 Thai FA Cup
 2015 Kor Royal Cup

References
 http://www.thailandsusu.com/webboard/index.php?topic=348244.0
 http://www.thailandsusu.com/webboard/index.php?topic=348292.0
 http://www.thailandsusu.com/webboard/index.php?topic=348451.0
 http://www.thailandsusu.com/webboard/index.php?topic=348599.0
 http://www.thailandsusu.com/webboard/index.php?topic=348679.0
 http://www.thailandsusu.com/webboard/index.php?topic=348758.0
 http://www.thailandsusu.com/webboard/index.php?topic=348775.0
 http://www.thailandsusu.com/webboard/index.php?topic=349007.0
 http://www.thailandsusu.com/webboard/index.php?topic=349055.0
 http://www.thailandsusu.com/webboard/index.php?topic=352153.0
 http://www.thailandsusu.com/webboard/index.php?topic=352210.0
 http://www.thailandsusu.com/webboard/index.php?topic=352263.0
 http://www.thailandsusu.com/webboard/index.php?topic=356514.0
 http://www.thailandsusu.com/webboard/index.php?topic=357599.0
 http://www.thailandsusu.com/webboard/index.php?topic=360484.0
 http://www.thailandsusu.com/webboard/index.php?topic=363646.0
 http://www.smmsport.com/score/competition172_%E0%B9%82%E0%B8%95%E0%B9%82%E0%B8%A2%E0%B8%95%E0%B9%89%E0%B8%B2%20%E0%B8%A5%E0%B8%B5%E0%B8%81%20%E0%B8%84%E0%B8%B1%E0%B8%9E%202015.html 
 http://www.smmsport.com/score/competition172_%E0%B9%82%E0%B8%95%E0%B9%82%E0%B8%A2%E0%B8%95%E0%B9%89%E0%B8%B2%20%E0%B8%A5%E0%B8%B5%E0%B8%81%20%E0%B8%84%E0%B8%B1%E0%B8%9E%202015.html

External links
 Official Tournament

2015 in Thai football cups
Thailand League Cup
2015
2015